Mads Fuglede (born 23 August 1971 in Copenhagen) is a Danish politician, who is a member of the Folketing for the Venstre political party. He was elected into parliament in the 2019 Danish general election.

Political career
Fuglede first ran for parliament in the 2015 Danish general election, where he received 1,968 votes. This was not enough for him to get elected, although he became Venstre's primary substitute in the constituency. When Jakob Engel-Schmidt took leave on 5 October 2017, Fuglede acted as substitute member for the remainder of the term. He was elected into parliament in the 2019 election, where he received 3,622 votes.

Bibliography
USA - den universelle nation (Gyldendal, 2008)

References

External links 
 Biography on the website of the Danish Parliament (Folketinget)

Living people
1971 births
Politicians from Copenhagen
Danish writers
Venstre (Denmark) politicians
Members of the Folketing 2019–2022
Members of the Folketing 2022–2026